

This is an incomplete list of U.S. college nicknames.

If two nicknames are given, the first is for men's teams and the second for women's teams, unless otherwise noted.

The 12 most-used names of four-year college teams (including names with attached adjectives such as "Blue", "Golden", "Flying" or "Fighting"): Eagles (118), Hawks (106), Tigers (72), Lions (65), Bulldogs (58), Cougars (58), Panthers (55), Bears (54), Knights (50), Wildcats (42), Warriors (41), and Pioneers (36).

A

AB-AD
 Abilene Christian Wildcats
 Abraham Baldwin Stallions
 Academy of Art Urban Knights
 Adams State Grizzlies
 Adelphi Panthers
 Adrian Bulldogs

AG-AK
 Agnes Scott Scotties
 Aiken Tech Knights
 Aims CC Aardvarks
 Air Force Falcons
 Akron Zips

ALA
 Alabama Crimson Tide
 Alabama–Birmingham Blazers
 Alabama–Huntsville Chargers
 Alabama A&M Bulldogs and Lady Bulldogs
 Alabama State Hornets and Lady Hornets
 Alamance CC River Otters
 Alameda Cougars
 Alaska–Anchorage Seawolves
 Alaska–Fairbanks Nanooks
 Alaska–Southeast Humpback Whales

ALB-ALI
 Albany Great Danes
 Albany Pharmacy/Health Panthers
 Albany Tech Titans
 Albemarle Dolphins
 Albertus Magnus Falcons
 Albion Britons
 Albright College Lions
 Alcorn State Braves and Lady Braves
 Alderson Broaddus Battlers
 Alexandria Tech/CC Legends
 Alfred Saxons
 Alfred State Pioneers
 Alice Lloyd Eagles

ALL-ALV
 Allan Hancock Bulldogs
 Allegany Maryland Trojans
 Allegheny Gators
 Allen Yellow Jackets
 Allen County Red Devils
 Alliance Warriors
 Alliant International Mountain Lions
 Alma Scots
 Alpena CC Lumberjacks
 Alvernia Golden Wolves
 Alverno Inferno
 Alvin CC Dolphins

AM
 Amarillo Badgers
 American Eagles
 American Indian Warriors
 American International Yellowjackets
 American Jewish Lions
 American River Beavers
 Amherst Mammoths

AN
 Anderson (IN) Ravens
 Anderson (SC) Trojans
 Andrew Fighting Tigers
 Andrews Cardinals
 Angelina Roadrunners
 Angelo State Rams and Rambelles
 Anna Maria AMCats
 Anne Arundel CC Riverhawks
 Antelope Valley Marauders
 Antioch Radicals

AP-AQ
 Appalachian Bible Warriors
 Appalachian State Mountaineers
 Aquinas (MI) Saints
 Aquinas (TN) Cavaliers

ARA-ARI
 Arapahoe CC Pumas
 Arcadia Knights
 Arizona Wildcats
 Arizona Christian Firestorm
 Arizona State Sun Devils
 Arizona Western Matadors

ARK-ARM
 Arkansas Razorbacks
 Arkansas–CC Batesville River Bandits
 Arkansas–CC Morrilton Timberwolves
 Arkansas–Fort Smith Lions
 Arkansas–Hope-Texarkana Iron Horse
 Arkansas–Little Rock Trojans
 Arkansas–Monticello Boll Weevils and Cotton Blossoms
 Arkansas–Pine Bluff Golden Lions
 Arkansas–Rich Mountain Deer
 Arkansas Baptist Buffaloes
 Arkansas State Red Wolves
 Arkansas State–Beebe Vanguards
 Arkansas State–Mid-South Greyhounds
 Arkansas State–Mountain Home Trailblazers
 Arkansas State–Newport Aviators
 Arkansas Tech Wonder Boys and Golden Suns
 Arlington Baptist Patriots
 Army Black Knights

AS
 ASA College (Miami) Silver Storm
 ASA College (New York) Avengers
 Asbury Eagles
 Asheville-Buncombe Tech CC Trailblazers
 Ashford Saints
 Ashland Eagles
 Asnuntuck CC Corsairs
 Assumption Greyhounds

AT
 Athens State Bears
 Athens Tech Owls
 Atlanta Metropolitan Trailblazers
 Atlanta Tech Skyhawks
 Atlantic Cape CC Buccaneers
 Atlantis Atlanteans
 A.T. Still Rams

AU
 Auburn Tigers (or Plainsmen)
 Auburn–Montgomery Warhawks
 Augsburg Auggies
 Augusta Jaguars
 Augusta Tech Cougars
 Augustana (IL) Vikings
 Augustana (SD) Vikings
 Aurora Spartans
 Austin Kangaroos
 Austin CC Riverbats
 Austin Peay Governors and Lady Govs

AV-AZ
 Ave Maria Gyrenes
 Averett Cougars
 Avila Eagles
 Azusa Pacific Cougars

B

BAB-BAP
 Babson Beavers
 Bacone Warriors
 Baker Wildcats
 Bakersfield Renegades
 Baldwin Wallace Yellow Jackets
 Baltimore Bees
 Baltimore City CC Panthers
 Ball State Cardinals
 Baptist Bible Patriots
 Baptist Florida Eagles

BAR-BAY
 Barber-Scotia Mighty Sabres
 Barclay Bears
 Barnard Bears
 Bard Raptors
 Bard Simon's Rock Llamas
 Barry Buccaneers
 Barstow CC Vikings
 Barton Bulldogs
 Barton CC Cougars
 Baruch Bearcats
 Bates Bobcats
 Baton Rouge CC Bears
 Baylor Bears
 Bay de Noc CC Norse
 Bay Path Wildcats
 Bay Ridge Christian Eagles

BEL-BEN
 Belhaven Blazers
 Bellarmine Knights
 Bellevue College Bulldogs
 Bellevue University Bruins
 Belmont Bruins
 Belmont Abbey Crusaders
 Beloit Buccaneers
 Bemidji State Beavers
 Benedict Tigers
 Benedictine College Ravens
 Benedictine University Eagles
 Bennett Belles
 Bennington Goatboys
 Bentley Falcons

BER-BEV
 Berea Mountaineers
 Bergen CC Bulldogs
 Berkeley Knights
 Berkshire CC Falcons
 Berry Vikings
 Bethany (KS) Swedes
 Bethany (WV) Bison
 Bethany Lutheran Vikings
 Bethel (IN) Pilots
 Bethel (KS) Threshers
 Bethel (MN) Royals
 Bethel (TN) Wildcats
 Bethesda Flames
 Bethune–Cookman Wildcats
 Bevill State CC Bears

BI
 Big Bend CC Vikings
 Binghamton Bearcats
 Biola Eagles
 Birmingham–Southern Panthers
 Bishop State CC Wildcats
 Bismarck State Mystics

BL
 Black Hawk Braves
 Black Hills State Yellow Jackets
 Blackburn Battlin' Beavers
 Bladen CC Eagles
 Blinn Buccaneers
 Bloomfield Bears
 Bloomsburg Huskies
 Blue Mountain Toppers
 Blue Mountain CC Timberwolves
 Blue Ridge CC Bears
 Bluefield Rams
 Bluefield State Big Blues and Lady Blues
 Bluffton Beavers

BO
 Bob Jones Bruins
 Boise State Broncos
 Bossier Parish CC Cavaliers
 Boston College Eagles
 Boston University Terriers
 Bowdoin Polar Bears
 Bowie State Bulldogs
 Bowling Green Falcons
 Boyce Bulldogs

BRA-BRI
 Bradley Braves
 Brandeis Judges
 Brazosport Gators
 Brenau Golden Tigers
 Brescia Bearcats
 Brevard Tornadoes
 Brewton-Parker Barons
 Briar Cliff Chargers
 Briarcliffe Seahawks
 Bridgeport Purple Knights
 Bridgewater Eagles
 Bridgewater State Bears
 Brigham Young Cougars
 Brigham Young Hawaii Seasiders
 Brigham Young Idaho Vikings
 Brightpoint CC Trailblazers
 Bristol CC Bayhawks

BRO-BRY
 Bronx CC Broncos
 Broward Seahawks
 Brunswick CC Dolphins
 Brookdale CC Blues
 Brookhaven Bears
 Brooklyn Bulldogs
 Broward College Seahawks
 Brown Bears
 Bryan Lions
 Bryant Bulldogs
 Bryant & Stratton Bobcats
 Bryn Athyn Lions
 Bryn Mawr Owls

BU
 Bucknell Bison
 Bucks County CC Centurions
 Buena Vista Beavers
 Buffalo Bulls
 Buffalo State Bengals
 Bunker Hill CC Bulldogs
 Bushnell Beacons
 Butler Bulldogs
 Butler CC Grizzlies
 Butler County CC Pioneers
 Butte Roadrunners

C

CAB-CALH
 Cabrillo Seahawks
 Cabrini Cavaliers
 Cairn Highlanders
 Caldwell Cougars
 Caldwell CC/Tech Cobras
 Calhoun CC Warhawks

UC (CAL)
 UC Berkeley Golden Bears
 UC Davis Aggies
 UC Irvine Anteaters
 UC Merced Golden Bobcats
 UC Riverside Highlanders
 UC San Diego Tritons
 UC Santa Barbara Gauchos
 UC Santa Cruz Banana Slugs
 UCLA Bruins

CALI
 California Baptist Lancers
 California Lutheran Kingsmen and Regals
 California Maritime Keelhaulers
 Caltech Beavers
 Cal Poly Pomona Broncos
 Cal Poly Mustangs
 Cal State Bakersfield Roadrunners
 Cal State Channel Islands Dolphins
 California State University, Chico — see Chico State
 Cal State Dominguez Hills Toros
 Cal State East Bay Pioneers
 California State University, Fresno — see Fresno State
 Cal State Fullerton Titans
 California State University, Long Beach — see Long Beach State
 Cal State Los Angeles Golden Eagles
 Cal State Monterey Bay Otters
 Cal State Northridge Matadors
 California State University, Sacramento — see Sacramento State
 Cal State San Bernardino Coyotes
 Cal State San Marcos Cougars
 Cal State Stanislaus Warriors
 California University of Pennsylvania Vulcans

CALU-CAN
 Calumet St. Joseph Crimson Wave
 Calvin Knights and Lady Knights
 Campbell Fighting Camels
 Campbellsville Tigers
 Camden CC Cougars
 Cameron Aggies
 Cañada Colts
 Canisius Golden Griffins
 Cankdeska Cikana CC C4
 Canyons Cougars

CAP-CAR
 Cape Cod CC Sharks
 Cape Fear CC Sea Devils
 Capital Crusaders
 Capital CC Commodores
 Capitol Tech Chargers
 Cardinal Stritch Wolves
 Carl Albert State Vikings
 Carl Sandburg Chargers
 Carleton Knights
 Carlow Celtics
 Carnegie Mellon Tartans
 Carolina Bruins
 Carroll College Fighting Saints
 Carroll CC Lynx
 Carroll University Pioneers
 Carson-Newman Eagles
 Carthage Red Men and Lady Reds

CAS-CAZ
 Cascadia Kodiaks
 Case Western Reserve Spartans
 Casper Thunderbirds
 Castleton Spartans
 Catawba Indians
 Catawba Valley CC Red Hawks
 Catholic Cardinals
 Cayuga CC Spartans
 Cazenovia Wildcats

CC
 CC Allegheny County Wildcats
 CC Aurora Red Foxes
 CC Baltimore County-Dundalk Lions
 CC Baltimore County-Essex Knights
 CC Denver Hawks
 CC Philadelphia Lions
 CC Rhode Island Knights
 CC Spokane Sasquatch

CEC-CENTE
 Cecil Seahawks
 Cedar Crest Falcons
 Cedar Valley Suns
 Cedarville Yellow Jackets
 Centenary College Gentlemen and Ladies
 Centenary University Cyclones

CENTRAL-CENTRAL L
 Central Dutch
 Central Alabama CC Trojans
 Central Arizona Vaqueros
 Central Arkansas Bears and Sugar Bears
 Central Baptist Mustangs & Lady Mustangs
 Central Carolina CC Cougars
 Central Carolina Tech Titans
 Central CC Raiders
 Central Connecticut Blue Devils
 College of Central Florida Patriots
 University of Central Florida Knights
 Central Christian Tigers
 Central Christian Bible Saints
 Central Georgia Tech Titans
 Central Lakes Raiders

CENTRAL M-CENTRAL W
 Central Maine CC Mustangs
 Central Methodist Eagles
 Central Michigan Chippewas
 Central Missouri Mules and Jennies
 Central New Mexico CC Cats
 Central Ohio Tech Titans
 Central Oklahoma Bronchos
 Central Oregon CC Bobcats
 Central Penn Knights
 Central Piedmont CC Meck Dec'ers
 Central State Marauders
 Central Texas Eagles
 Central Washington Wildcats
 Central Wyoming Rustlers

CENTRALI-CER
 Centralia Trailblazers
 Centre Colonels
 Century Wood Ducks
 Cerritos Falcons
 Cerro Coso CC Coyotes

CHA-CHE
 Chabot Gladiators
 Chadron State Eagles
 Chaffey Panthers
 Chaminade Silverswords
 Champion Christian Tigers
 Champlain Beavers
 Chapman Panthers
 Chandler-Gilbert CC Coyotes
 Chatham Cougars
 Charleston Cougars
 Charleston (WV) (or UCWV) Golden Eagles
 Charleston Southern Buccaneers and Lady Bucs
 Chattahoochee Tech Golden Eagles
 Chattahoochee Valley CC Pirates
 Chattanooga Mocs
 Chemeketa CC Storm

CHO-CHR
 Chowan Braves
 Christendom Crusaders
 Chesapeake Skipjacks
 Chestnut Hill Griffins
 Cheyney Wolves
 Chicago Maroons
 Chicago State Cougars
 Chico State Wildcats
 Chipola Indians
 Christian Brothers Buccaneers
 Christopher Newport Captains

CI
 Cincinnati Bearcats
 Cincinnati State Tech/CC Surge
 Cisco Wranglers
 The Citadel Bulldogs
 Claremont McKenna College, Harvey Mudd College, Scripps College Stags and Athenas
 Citrus Owls
 City CUNY Beavers
 City San Francisco Rams

CL
 Clackamas CC Cougars
 Claflin Panthers
 Clarendon Bulldogs
 Claremont McKenna Stags & Athenas
 Clarion Golden Eagles
 Clark Atlanta Panthers
 Clark Penguins 
 Clark State Eagles
 Clarke Crusaders
 Clarks Summit Defenders
 Clarkson Golden Knights
 Clatsop CC Bandits
 Clayton State Lakers
 Clearwater Christian Cougars
 Clemson Tigers
 Cleveland CC Yetis
 Cleveland State Vikings
 Clinton Golden Bears
 Clinton CC Cougars
 Cloud County CC Thunderbirds
 Clovis CC Crush

COA-COK
 Coahoma CC Tigers
 Coast Guard Bears
 Coastal Bend Cougars
 Coastal Carolina Chanticleers
 Coastal Alabama CC Eagles
 Coastal Carolina CC Cougars
 Coastal Georgia Mariners
 Coastal Pines Tech Rays
 Coastline CC Dolphins
 Cochise Apaches
 Coconino CC Comets
 Coe Kohawks
 Coffeyville CC Red Ravens
 Coker Cobras

COL-COLO
 Colby White Mules
 Colby CC Trojans
 Colgate Raiders
 College of Idaho Yotes
 College of New Jersey Lions
 Collin Cougars
 Colorado-Boulder Buffaloes
 Colorado Christian Cougars
 Colorado-Colorado Springs Mountain Lions
 Colorado-Denver Lynx
 Colorado College Tigers
 Colorado Mesa Mavericks
 Colorado Mines Orediggers
 Colorado Mountain Eagles
 Colorado Northwestern CC Spartans
 Colorado State Rams
 Colorado State Global Golden Eagles
 Colorado State–Pueblo ThunderWolves

COLU
 Columbia (CA) Claim Jumpers
 Columbia Chicago Renegades
 Columbia (MO) Cougars
 Columbia (SC) Koalas
 Columbia CC Chargers
 Columbia Basin Hawks
 Columbia Gorge CC Chinooks
 Columbia International Rams
 Columbia Southern Knights
 Columbia University Lions
 Columbia-Greene CC Twins
 Columbus State Cougars
 Columbus State CC Cougars

COM-CONC
 Compton Tartars
 Concord Mountain Lions and Lady Lions
 Concordia (CA) Eagles
 Concordia (IL) Cougars
 Concordia (MI) Cardinals
 Concordia (Moorhead, MN) Cobbers
 Concordia (St. Paul, MN) Golden Bears
 Concordia (NE) Bulldogs
 Concordia (TX) Tornadoes
 Concordia (WI) Falcons
 Concordia Seminary Preachers

CONN-COP
 Connecticut – see UConn
 Connecticut College Camels
 Connors State Cowboys
 Contra Costa Comets
 Converse Valkyries
 Copiah-Lincoln CC Wolf Pack
 Copper Mountain Fighting Cacti
 Coppin State Eagles

COR-COW
 Corban Warriors
 Cornell College Rams
 Cornell University Big Red
 Cornerstone Golden Eagles
 Corning Red Barons
 Cossatot CC Colts
 Cosumnes River Hawks
 Creative Studies Detroit Peacocks
 Cottey Comets
 County College of Morris Titans
 Covenant Scots
 Cowley CC Tigers

CR
 Crafton Hills Roadrunners
 Creighton Blue Jays
 Crowder Rough Riders
 Crowley's Ridge Pioneers
 Crown Storm

CU-CY
 Cuesta Cougars
 Culinary Institute of America Steels
 Culver-Stockton Wildcats
 Cumberland Phoenix
 Cumberlands Patriots
 Curry Colonels
 Cuyahoga CC Triceratops
 Cuyamaca Coyotes
 Cypress Chargers

D

DA
 Daemen Wildcats
 Dakota Bottineau Lumberjacks
 Dakota County Tech Blue Knights
 Dakota State Trojans
 Dakota Wesleyan Tigers
 Daley Bulldogs
 Dallas Crusaders
 Dallas Baptist Patriots
 Dallas Christian Crusaders
 Dalton State Roadrunners
 Dana Vikings
 Danville CC Knights
 Danville Area CC Jaguars
 Dartmouth Big Green
 Davis & Elkins Senators
 Davenport Panthers
 Davidson Wildcats
 Davidson-Davie CC Storm
 Davis Falcons
 Dawson CC Buccaneers
 Dayton Flyers
 Daytona State Falcons

DE-DEL
 De Anza Mountain Lions
 Dean Bulldogs
 Defiance Yellow Jackets
 Del Mar Vikings
 Delaware Fightin' Blue Hens
 Delaware County CC Phantoms
 Delaware State Hornets
 Delaware Tech CC Spirit (Stanton/Wilmington), Hawks (Terry), Roadrunners (Georgetown)
 Delaware Valley Aggies
 Delgado CC Dolphins
 Delta Pioneers
 Delta State Statesmen and Lady Statesmen (unofficial: Fighting Okra)

DEN-DET
 Denison Big Red
 Denmark Tech Panthers
 Denver Pioneers
 DePaul Blue Demons
 DePauw Tigers
 Des Moines Area CC Bears
 DeSales Bulldogs
 Desert Roadrunners
 Detroit Mercy Titans

DI
 Diablo Valley Vikings
 Dickinson Red Devils
 Dickinson State Hawks
 Dillard Bleu Devils
 Diné Warriors
 District of Columbia Firebirds and Lady Firebirds
 Doane Tigers
 Dominican California Penguins
 Dominican University (IL) Stars
 Dominican University (NY) Chargers
 Donnelly Dragons
 Dordt Defenders
 Dowling Golden Lions

DR
 Drake Bulldogs
 Drake State CC/Tech Eagles
 Drew Rangers
 Drexel Dragons
 Drury Panthers

DU-DY
 Duke Blue Devils
 Dubuque Spartans
 DuPage Chaparrals
 Duquesne Dukes
 Dutchess CC Falcons
 Dyersburg State CC Eagles
 D'Youville Saints

E

EAR-EAST
 Earlham Hustlin' Quakers 
 East Carolina Pirates
 East Central Falcons
 East Central CC Warriors
 East Georgia State Bobcats
 East Los Angeles Huskies and Lady Huskies
 East Stroudsburg Warriors
 East Tennessee State (or ETSU) Buccaneers
 East Texas Baptist Tigers
 East-West Phantoms

EASTERN-EASTFIELD
 Eastern (PA) Eagles
 Eastern Arizona College Gila Monsters
 Eastern Connecticut State Warriors
 Eastern Florida State Titans
 Eastern Idaho Falcons
 Eastern Illinois Panthers
 Eastern Kentucky Colonels and Lady Colonels
 Eastern Mennonite Royals
 Eastern Michigan Eagles
 Eastern Nazarene Lions
 Eastern New Mexico Greyhounds
 Eastern Oklahoma State Mountaineers
 Eastern Oregon Mountaineers
 Eastern Washington Eagles
 Eastern Wyoming Lancers
 Eastfield Harvesters

EC-ED
 Ecclesia Royals
 Eckerd Tritons
 East Coast Poly Rams 
 Edinboro Fighting Scots
 Edison State CC Chargers
 Edmonds Tritons
 Edward Waters Tigers

EL
 El Camino Warriors
 El Paso CC Tejanos and Lady Tejanos
 Elgin CC Spartans
 Elizabeth City State Vikings
 Elizabethtown Blue Jays
 Ellsworth CC Panthers
 Elmhurst Bluejays
 Elmira Soaring Eagles
 Elms Blazers
 Elon Phoenix

EM
 Embry–Riddle Eagles
 Emerson Lions
 Emmanuel (Georgia) Lions
 Emmanuel (Massachusetts) Saints
 Emmaus Bible Eagles
 Emory Eagles
 Emory & Henry Wasps
 Emporia State Hornets

EN-ES
 Endicott Gulls
 Enterprise State CC Boll Weevils
 Erie CC Kats 
 Erskine Flying Fleet
 Essex County Wolverines
 Estrella Mountain CC Mountain Lions

EU-EV
 Eureka Red Devils
 Evangel Crusaders
 Evansville Purple Aces
 Everett CC Trojans
 Everglades Egrets
 Evergreen State Geoducks
 Evergreen Valley Hawks

F

FA
 Fairfax Tigers
 Fairleigh Dickinson (Florham Campus) Devils
 Fairleigh Dickinson (Metropolitan Campus) Knights
 Fairfield Stags
 Fairmont State Falcons
 Faith Baptist Bible Eagles
 FIT Tigers
 Faulkner Eagles
 Fayetteville State Broncos
 Fayeteville Tech CC Trojans

FE
 Feather River Golden Eagles
 Ferris State Bulldogs
 Ferrum Panthers
 Felician Golden Falcons

FI
 Findlay Oilers 
 Finger Lakes CC Lakers
 Finlandia Lions
 Fisher Falcons
 Fisk Bulldogs
 Fitchburg Falcons
 Five Towns Sound

FL
 Flagler Saints
 Florence-Darlington Tech Stingers
 Florida Gators
 Florida A&M Rattlers
 Florida Atlantic Owls
 Florida College Falcons
 Florida Gateway Timberwolves
 Florida Gulf Coast Eagles
 Florida Keys Tugas
 Florida International Panthers
 Florida Memorial Lions
 Florida National Conquistadors
 Florida Poly Phoenix 
 Florida Southern Moccasins
 Florida SouthWestern State College Buccaneers
 Florida State-Jacksonville Blue Wave
 Florida State Seminoles
 Florida Tech Panthers

FO
 Folsom Lake Falcons
 Fond du Lac Tribal/CC Thunder
 Foothill Owls
 Fordham Rams
 Forsyth Tech CC Trailblazers
 Fort Hays State Tigers
 Fort Lauderdale Eagles
 Fort Lewis Skyhawks
 Fort Valley State Wildcats
 Fox Valley Tech Foxes

FR
 Framingham State Rams
 Francis Marion Patriots
 Franciscan Steubenville Barons
 Franciscan Missionaries Wolves
 Franklin College Grizzlies
 Franklin Raiders
 Franklin and Marshall Diplomats
 Frederick CC Cougars
 Free Lutheran Conquerors
 Freed-Hardeman Lions and Lady Lions
 Fresno City Rams
 Fresno Pacific Sunbirds
 Fresno State Bulldogs
 Friends Falcons
 Fresno State Bulldogs
 Front Range CC Wolves
 Frostburg State Bobcats

FU
 Fullerton Hornets
 Fulton-Montgomery CC Raiders
 Furman Paladins

G

GA
 Gadsden State CC Cardinals
 Gallaudet Bison
 Galveston Whitecaps
 Gannon Golden Knights
 Garden City CC Cowboys
 Gardner-Webb Runnin' Bulldogs
 Garrett Lakers
 Gateway CC Geckos
 Gateway Tech Red Hawks
 Gavilan Rams

GE
 Genesee CC Cougars
 Geneva Golden Tornadoes
 George Fox Bruins
 George Mason Patriots
 George C. Wallace CC Governors and Lady Govs
 George Washington Colonials
 Georgetown College Tigers
 Georgetown University Hoyas
 Georgia Bulldogs
 Georgia College/State Bobcats
 Georgia Gwinnett Grizzlies
 Georgia College Chargers
 Georgia Northwestern Tech Bobcats
 Georgia Southern Eagles and Lady Eagles
 Georgia Southern-Armstrong Pirates
 Georgia Southwestern State Hurricanes
 Georgia State Panthers
 Georgia Tech Yellow Jackets
 Georgian Court Lions
 Gettysburg Bullets

GI-GL
 Gillette Antelopes
 Glendale CC (AZ) Gauchos
 Glendale CC (CA) Vaqueros
 Glenville State Pioneers and Lady Pioneers

GO
 Gogebic CC Samsons
 Golden Gate Griffins
 Golden State Baptist Bears
 Golden West Rustlers
 Goldey-Beacom Braves
 Gonzaga Bulldogs
 Goodwin Navigators
 Gordon Fighting Scots
 Gordon State Highlanders
 Goshen Maple Leafs
 Goucher Gophers
 Governors State Jaguars

GR
 Grace Lancers
 Graceland Yellow Jackets
 Grambling State Tigers and Lady Tigers
 Grand Canyon Antelopes (alternately Lopes)
 Grand Rapids CC Raiders
 Grand Valley State Lakers
 Grand View Vikings
 Granite State Moose
 Great Basin Rams
 Great Lakes Christian Crusaders
 Green River Gators
 Greensboro Pride
 Greenville Panthers
 Grinnell Pioneers
 Grossmont Griffins
 Grove City Wolverines

GU-GW
 Guilford Quakers
 Guilford Tech CC Titans
 Gulf Coast State Commodores
 Gustavus Adolphus Golden Gusties
 Guttman CC Grizzlies
 Gwynedd Mercy Griffins

H

HAG-HAN
 Hagerstown CC Hawks
 Halifax CC Knights
 Hamilton Continentals
 Hampton Pirates
 Hampden-Sydney Tigers
 Hampshire Black Sheep
 Hannibal–LaGrange University Trojans
 Hanover Panthers

HAR
 Harcum Bears
 Hardin-Simmons Cowboys
 Harding Bison
 Harford CC Fighting Owls
 Harper Hawks
 Harris-Stowe State Hornets
 Harrisburg Area CC Hawks
 Harrisburg Science/Tech Storm
 Hartford Hawks
 Hartnell Panthers
 Hartwick Hawks
 Harvard Crimson

HAS-HAY
 Haskell Indian Nations Fighting Indians
 Hastings Broncos
 Hawaii Rainbow Warriors and Rainbow Wāhine
 Hawaii–Hilo Vulcans
 Hawaii Pacific Sharks
 Hawaii-West Oahu Owls
 Hawkeye CC Red-Tailed Hawks
 Haywood CC Bobcats

HE
 Heartland CC Hawks
 Heidelberg Student Princes
 Henderson State Reddies
 Hendrix Warriors
 Henry Ford Hawks
 Herkimer County CC Generals

HI
 Hibbing CC Cardinals
 High Point Panthers
 Highland CC Cougars
 Highline Thunderbirds
 Hilbert Hawks
 Hill Rebels 
 Hillsborough CC Hawks
 Hillsdale Chargers
 Hinds CC Eagles 
 Hiram Terriers

HOB-HOS
 Hobart Statesmen
 Hocking Hawks
 Hodges Hawks 
 Hofstra Pride
 Holmes CC Bulldogs
 Holy Cross (IN) Saints
 Holy Cross (MA) Crusaders
 Holy Family Tigers
 Holy Names Hawks
 Holyoke CC Cougars
 Hope Flying Dutchmen
 Hope International Royals
 Horry-Georgetown Tech Gators
 Hostos CC Caimans

HOU-HOW
 Houghton Highlanders 
 Housatonic CC Hawks
 Houston Cougars
 Houston Christian Huskies
 Houston CC Eagles
 Houston-Downtown Gators
 Houston-Clear Lake Hawks
 Houston-Victoria Jaguars
 Howard College Hawks
 Howard University Bison
 Howard CC Dragons
 Howard Payne Yellow Jackets

HU
 Hudson Valley CC Vikings
 Humboldt State Lumberjacks
 Hunter Hawks
 Huntingdon Hawks
 Huntington Foresters
 Husson Braves 
 Huston-Tillotson Rams
 Hutchinson CC Blue Dragons

I

ID-IL
 Idaho Vandals
 Idaho State Bengals
 Illinois Fighting Illini
 Illinois-Chicago Flames
 Illinois-Springfield Prairie Stars
 Illinois Central Cougars
 Illinois College Blue Boys and Lady Blues
 Illinois State Redbirds
 Illinois Tech Scarlet Hawks
 Illinois Valley CC Eagles
 Illinois Wesleyan Titans

IM-IN
 Immaculata Mighty Macs
 Incarnate Word Cardinals
 Independence CC Pirates
 Indian Hills CC Warriors
 Indian River State Pioneers
 Indiana State Sycamores
 Indianapolis (or UIndy) Greyhounds
 IU Bloomington Hoosiers
 IU Kokomo Cougars
 IUPUI Jaguars
 Indiana University of Pennsylvania (IUP) Crimson Hawks
 IU South Bend Titans
 IU Southeast Grenadiers
 Indiana Tech Warriors
 Indiana Wesleyan Wildcats

IO
 Iona Gaels
 Iowa Hawkeyes
 Iowa Central CC Tritons
 Iowa Lakes CC Lakers
 Iowa State Cyclones
 Iowa Wesleyan Tigers
 Iowa Western CC Reivers

IR-IT
 Irvine Valley Lasers
 Isothermal CC Patriots
 Itasca CC Vikings
 Itawamba CC Indians
 Ithaca Bombers

J

JA
 Jackson College Jets
 Jackson State CC Green Jays
 Jackson State Tigers and Lady Tigers
 Jacksonville Dolphins
 Jacksonville State Gamecocks
 James Madison Dukes
 James Sprunt Spartans
 Jamestown Jimmies
 Jamestown CC Jayhawks
 Jarvis Christian Bulldogs

JE
 Jefferson College Vikings
 Jefferson University Rams

JO-JU
 John Brown Golden Eagles
 John Carroll Blue Streaks
 John Jay Bloodhounds
 John Paul the Great Pelicans
 John Wood CC Trail Blazers
 Johnson College Jaguars
 Johns Hopkins Blue Jays
 Johnson (FL) Suns
 Johnson (TN) Royals
 Johnson & Wales Wildcats
 Johnson C. Smith Golden Bulls
 Johnston CC Jaguars
 Johnson County CC Cavaliers
 Joliet Junior Wolves
 Jones County Junior Bobcats
 Juniata Eagles

K

KA
 Kalamazoo Fighting Hornets
 Kalamazoo Valley CC Cougars
 Kankakee CC Cavaliers
 Kansas Jayhawks
 Kansas Christian Falcons
 Kansas City Roos
 Kansas City (KS) CC Blue Devils
 Kansas State Wildcats
 Kansas Wesleyan Coyotes
 Kaskaskia Blue Angels

KE
 Kean Cougars
 Keene State Owls
 Keiser Seahawks
 Kellogg CC Bruins
 Kennedy-King Statesmen
 Kennesaw State Owls
 Kent State Golden Flashes
 Kentucky Wildcats
 Kentucky Christian Knights
 Kentucky State Thorobreds and Thorobrettes
 Kentucky Wesleyan Panthers
 Kenyon Owls
 Kettering Bulldogs
 Keuka Wolves

KI-KL
 Kilgore Rangers
 King Tornado
 King's College Monarchs
 The King's College Lions
 Kirkwood CC Eagles
 Kishwaukee Cougars
 Klamath CC Badgers

KN-KU
 Knox Prairie Fire
 Knoxville Bulldogs
 Kutztown Golden Bears
 Kuyper Cougars

L

LA-LAG
 La Roche Red Hawks 
 La Salle Explorers
 La Sierra Golden Eagles
 La Verne Leopards
 Labette CC Cardinals
 Lackawanna Falcons
 Lafayette Leopards
 LaGrange Panthers
 LaGuardia CC Red Hawks

LAK 
 Lake County Lancers
 Lake Erie Storm
 Lake Forest Foresters
 Lake Land Lakers
 Lake Michigan Red Hawks
 Lake Region State Royals
 Lake-Sumter State Lakers
 Lake Superior State Lakers
 Lake Tahoe CC Coyotes
 Lakeland Muskies
 Lakeland CC Lakers

LAM-LAN
 Lamar Cardinals and Lady Cardinals
 Lamar CC Runnin' Lopes
 Lamar State-Port Arthur Seahawks
 Lancaster Bible Chargers
 Lander Bearcats
 Landmark Sharks
 Lane Dragons
 Lane CC Titans 
 Laney Eagles
 Langston Lions and Lady Lions
 Lanier Tech Knights
 Lansing CC Stars

LAR-LAW
 Laramie County CC Golden Eagles
 Laredo Palominos
 Las Positas Hawks
 Lasell Lasers
 Lassen CC Cougars
 Lawrence Vikings
 Lawrence Tech Blue Devils
 Lawson State CC Cougars

LE
 Le Moyne Dolphins
 Lebanon Valley Flying Dutchmen
 Lee College Rebels
 Lee University Flames
 Leech Lake Lakers
 Lees-McRae Bobcats
 Lehigh Mountain Hawks
 Lehigh Carbon CC Cougars
 Lehman Lightning
 LeMoyne-Owen Magicians
 Lenoir CC Lancers
 Lenoir-Rhyne Bears
 Lesley Lynx
 LeTourneau Yello Jackets
 Lewis & Clark Pioneers
 Lewis & Clark CC Trailblazers
 Lewis-Clark State Warriors

LI
 Liberty Flames and Lady Flames
 Life Running Eagles
 Life Pacific Warriors
 Limestone Saints
 Lincoln Christian Red Lions
 Lincoln Land CC Loggers
 Lincoln (IL) Lynx
 Lincoln (MO) Blue Tigers
 Lincoln (PA) Lions
 Lincoln Christian Lions 
 Lincoln Memorial Railsplitters
 Lincoln Trail Statesmen
 Lindenwood Lions
 Lindsey Wilson Blue Raiders
 Linfield Wildcats
 Linn-Benton CC Roadrunners
 Lipscomb Bisons
 Little Priest Warriors
 Livingstone Blue Bears

LOG-LOR
 Logan College Volunteers
 Logan University Leopards
 Loma Linda Lions
 Long Beach City Vikings
 Long Island Sharks
 Long Island Post Pioneers
 Lock Haven Bald Eagles
 Lone Star CyFair Falcons
 Lone Star Montgomery Mavericks
 Lone Star North Harris Hurricanes 
 Lone Star Tomball Timberwolves
 Long Beach State — The Beach
 Longwood Lancers
 Lorain County CC Commodores
 Loras Duhawks

LOS
 Los Angeles City Cubs
 Los Angeles Harbor Seahawks
 Los Angeles Mission Eagles
 Los Angeles Pierce Brahmas
 Los Angeles Southeast Cougars
 Los Angeles Trade-Tech Beavers
 Los Angeles Valley Monarchs 
 Los Medanos Mustangs

LOU
 Louisburg Hurricanes 
 Louisiana Ragin' Cajuns
 Louisiana–Monroe Warhawks
 Louisiana Christian Wildcats
 Louisiana Delta CC Knights
 Louisiana State Tigers and Lady Tigers
 Louisiana State-Alexandria Generals
 Louisiana State-Eunice Bengals
 Louisiana State-Shreveport Pilots
 Louisiana Tech Bulldogs and Lady Techsters
 Louisville Cardinals
 Louisville Bible Trailblazers
 Lourdes Gray Wolves

LOW-LOY
 Lower Columbia Red Devils
 Loyola Chicago Ramblers
 Loyola Maryland Greyhounds
 Loyola Marymount Lions
 Loyola New Orleans Wolfpack

LU
 Lubbock Christian Chaparrals and Lady Chaps
 Luna CC Roughriders
 Lurleen B. Wallace CC Saints
 Luther Norse
 Luzerne County CC Trailblazers

LY
 Lycoming Warriors
 Lynchburg Hornets
 Lynn Fighting Knights
 Lyon Scots and Pipers

M

MAC-MAL
 Macalester Scots
 Macaulay Marauders
 Macomb CC Monarchs
 Madison Area Tech Wolf Pack
 Madonna Crusaders
 Maine Black Bears
 Maine-Augusta Moose
 Maine-Farmington Beavers
 Maine-Machias Clippers
 Maine-Presque Isle Owls
 Maine Maritime Mariners
 Mainland Fighting Ducks
 Malcolm X Hawks
 Malone Pioneers

MAN
 Manchester CC Cougars
 Manchester College Spartans
 Manchester University Spartans
 Manhattan Jaspers and Lady Jaspers
 Manhattan Area Tech Bison
 Manhattan CC Panthers
 Manhattan Christian Thunder
 Manhattanville Valiants
 Manor Blue Jays
 Mansfield Mountaineers

MAR
 Maranatha Baptist Sabercats
 Marian Knights
 Marietta Pioneers
 Marin Mariners
 Marion Military Institute Tigers
 Marist Red Foxes
 Marquette Golden Eagles
 Mars Hill Mountain Lions
 Marshall Thundering Herd
 Marshalltown CC Tigers
 Martin Luther Knights
 Mary Marauders
 Mary Baldwin Fighting Squirrels
 Mary Hardin–Baylor Crusaders
 Mary Washington Eagles
 Maryland Terrapins
 Maryland-Baltimore County Retrievers
 Maryland-Eastern Shore Hawks
 Marymount Saints
 Marymount Manhattan Griffins
 Maryville College Scots
 Maryville University Saints
 Marywood Pacers

MAS-MAY
 MassArt Mastodons
 UMass Minutemen
 UMass Amherst Minutemen and Minutewomen
 UMass Boston Beacons
 UMass Dartmouth Corsairs
 UMass Lowell River Hawks
 Massachusetts Bay CC Buccaneers
 Massachusetts Liberal Arts Trailblazers
 Massachusetts Maritime Academy Buccaneers
 Massasoit CC Warriors
 Master's Mustangs
 Mayland CC Mountain Lions
 Mayville State Comets

MC
 McDaniel Green Terror
 McHenry County Fighting Scots
 McKendree Bearcats
 McLennan CC Highlanders
 McNeese State Cowboys and Cowgirls
 McMurry Hawks
 McPherson Bulldogs

ME
 Medaille Mavericks
 Medgar Evers Cougars
 Memphis Tigers
 Mendocino Eagles
 Menlo Oaks
 Merced Blue Devils and Lady Devils
 Mercer Bears
 Mercer County CC Vikings
 Merchant Marine Mariners
 Mercy Mavericks
 Mercyhurst Lakers
 Meredith Avenging Angels
 Meridian CC Eagles
 Merrimack Warriors
 Merritt Thunderbirds
 Mesa CC Thunderbirds
 Mesabi Range Norse
 Mesalands CC Cows
 Messiah Falcons
 Methodist Monarchs
 Metro State Roadrunners
 Metropolitan CC Wolves
 Metropolitan State Rodents

MIA-MID
 Miami Hurricanes
 Miami Dade Sharks 
 Miami (Ohio) RedHawks
 Miami-Hamilton Harriers
 Miami-Middletown Thunderhawks
 Michigan Wolverines
 Michigan State Spartans
 Michigan Tech Huskies
 Mid Michigan Lakers
 Mid-America Christian Evangels
 MidAmerica Nazarene Pioneers
 Middle Georgia State Knights
 Middle Tennessee Blue Raiders
 Middlebury Panthers
 Middlesex Colts
 Middlesex CC Owls
 Midland College Chaparrals
 Midland University Warriors
 Midlands Tech Mavericks
 Midway Eagles
 Midwestern State Mustangs and Lady Mustangs

MIL-MIN
 Miles Golden Bears
 Miles CC Pioneers
 Mills Cyclones
 Milligan Buffaloes
 Millikin Big Blue
 Millsaps Majors
 Millersville Marauders 
 Milwaukee Engineering Raiders
 Mineral Area Cardinals
 Minnesota Golden Gophers
 Minnesota-Crookston Golden Eagles
 Minnesota-Duluth Bulldogs
 Minnesota-Morris Cougars
 Minnesota-Twin Cities Golden Gophers
 Minnesota State Mankato Mavericks
 Minnesota State Moorhead Dragons
 Minnesota State CC/Tech Spartans
 Minnesota West CC/Tech Blue Jays
 Minot State Beavers

MIR-MIT
 MiraCosta Spartans
 Miramar Jets
 Misericordia Cougars
 Mission Saints
 Mississippi – see Ole Miss
 Mississippi College Choctaws
 Mississippi Delta CC Trojans
 Mississippi Gulf Coast CC Bulldogs
 Mississippi State Bulldogs
 Mississippi Valley State Delta Devils and Devilettes
 Missouri Tigers
 Missouri Baptist Spartans
 Missouri–St. Louis Tritons
 Missouri Science/Tech Miners
 Missouri Southern Lions
 Missouri State Bears and Lady Bears
 Missouri State-West Plains Grizzlies
 Missouri Valley Vikings
 Missouri Western Griffons
 MIT Engineers
 Mitchell CC Mavericks
 Mitchell Tech Mavericks

MOB-MON
 Mobile Rams
 Moberly Area CC Greyhounds
 Mobile University Rams
 Modesto Junior Pirates
 Mohawk Valley CC Hawks
 Molloy Lions
 Monmouth College Fighting Scots
 Monmouth University Hawks
 Monroe Mustangs
 Monroe CC Tribunes
 Monroe County CC Huskies
 Montana Grizzlies
 Montana-Western Bulldogs
 Montana State Bobcats
 Montana State-Billings Yellowjackets
 Montana State-Northern Northern Lights
 Montana Tech Orediggers
 Montcalm CC Centurions
 Montclair State Red Hawks
 Montevallo Falcons
 Montgomery Raptors
 Montgomery County CC Mustangs
 Montreat Cavaliers

MOO-MOT
 Moorpark Raiders
 Moraine Park Tech Wolves
 Moraine Valley CC Cyclones
 Moravian Greyhounds
 Morehead State Eagles
 Morehouse Maroon Tigers
 Moreno Valley Lions
 Morgan CC Roadrunners
 Morgan State Bears and Lady Bears
 Morningside Mustangs
 Morris Hornets
 Morris Brown Wolverines
 Morrisville State Mustangs
 Morton Panthers
 Motlow State CC Bucks
 Mott CC Bears

MOU
 Mount Aloysius Mounties
 Mount Holyoke Lyons
 Mount Mary Blue Angels
 Mount Marty Lancers
 Mount Mercy Mustangs
 Mount Olive Trojans
 Mount Saint Mary Knights
 Mount Saint Mary's (MD) Mountaineers
 Mount Saint Mary's (CA) Athenians
 Mount St. Joseph Mountain Lions
 Mount Saint Vincent Dolphins
 Mount Union Purple Raiders
 Mount Vernon Nazarene Cougars
 Mount Wachusett CC Mountain Lions
 Mountain View Lions

MT
 Mt. Hood CC Saints
 Mt. San Antonio Mounties
 Mt. San Jacinto Eagles

MU
 Muhlenberg Mules
 Multnomah Lions
 Murray State College Aggies 
 Murray State University Racers
 Muskegon CC Jayhawks
 Muskingum Fighting Muskies

N

NA
 Napa Valley Storm
 Nash CC Owls
 Nashua CC Jaguars
 Nassau CC Lions
 National Park Nighthawks
 Navajo Tech Skyhawks
 Navarro Bulldogs
 Navy Midshipmen
 Nazareth College Golden Flyers

NEB-NEV
 Nebraska Cornhuskers
 Nebraska Tech Agriculture Aggies
 Nebraska Indian CC Buffaloes
 Nebraska-Kearney Lopers
 Nebraska-Lincoln Cornhuskers
 Nebraska–Omaha Mavericks
 Nebraska Wesleyan Prairie Wolves
 Neosho County CC Panthers
 Neumann Knights
 Nevada-Reno Wolf Pack
 Nevada-Las Vegas Rebels
 Nevada State Scorpions

NEW
 New England (ME) Nor'easters
 New England College Pilgrims
 New England Tech Tigers
 New Hampshire Wildcats
 New Haven Chargers
 New Hope Christian Deacons
 New Jersey City Gothic Knights
 New Mexico Lobos
 New Mexico Highlands Cowboys
 New Mexico Junior Thunderbirds
 New Mexico Mines Pygmies
 New Mexico State Aggies
 New Orleans Privateers and Lady Privateers
 The New School Narwhals
 Newberry Wolves
 Newman Jets

NH-NJ
 NHTI Lynx
 Niagara Purple Eagles
 Niagara County CC Thunderwolves
 Nichols Bison
 Nicholls Colonels
 NJIT Highlanders

NORC-NORM
 Norco Mustangs
 Norfolk State Spartans
 Normandale CC Lions

NORTH A-NORTH C
 North Alabama Lions
 North American Stallions
 North Arkansas Pioneers
 UNC Asheville Bulldogs
 North Carolina Tar Heels
 UNC Charlotte 49ers
 UNC Greensboro Spartans
 UNC Pembroke Braves
 UNC Wilmington Seahawks
 North Carolina A&T Aggies
 North Carolina Central Eagles
 North Carolina School of the Arts Fighting Pickles
 NC State Wolfpack
 North Central College Cardinals
 North Central Kansas Tech Trailblazers
 North Central Michigan Timberwolves
 North Central Missouri Pirates
 North Central Texas Lions
 North Central Rams
 North Country CC Saints

NORTH D-NORTH T
 North Dakota Fighting Hawks
 North Dakota State Bison
 North Dakota State Science Wildcats
 North Georgia Nighthawks
 North Georgia Tech Wolves
 North Greenville Crusaders
 North Florida Ospreys
 North Florida CC Sentinels
 North Hennepin CC Norsemen
 North Idaho Cardinals
 North Iowa Area CC Trojans
 North Lake Blazers
 North Park Vikings
 North Seattle Tree Frogs
 North Texas Mean Green
 North Texas-Dallas Trailblazers

NORTHA-NORTHEAST
 Northampton CC Spartans
 Northcentral Roadrunners
 Northcentral Tech Timberwolves
 Northeast Alabama CC Mustangs
 Northeast CC Hawks
 Northeast Mississippi CC Tigers
 Northeast State CC Bears
 Northeast Texas CC Eagles
 Northeast Wisconsin Tech Eagles

NORTHEASTERN
 Northeastern Huskies
 Northeastern Illinois Golden Eagles
 Northeastern Junior Plainsmen
 Northeastern Oklahoma A&M Norse
 Northeastern State Riverhawks
 Northeastern Tech Spartans

NORTHERN-NORTHLAND
 Northern Arizona Lumberjacks
 Northern Colorado Bears
 Northern Essex CC Knights
 Northern Illinois Huskies
 Northern Iowa Panthers
 Northern Kentucky Norse
 Northern Maine CC Falcons
 Northern Michigan Wildcats
 Northern New Mexico Eagles
 Northern State Wolves
 Northern Vermont–Johnson Badgers
 Northern Vermont–Lyndon Hornets
 Northern Virginia CC Nighthawks
 Northland LumberJacks and LumberJills
 Northland CC & Tech Pioneers

NORTHWEST
 Northwest Eagles
 Northwest Christian Beacons
 Northwest College Trappers
 Northwest Florida Raiders
 Northwest Missouri Bearcats
 Northwest Nazarene Nighthawks
 Northwest Vista Wildcats
 Northwest-Shoals CC Patriots

NORTHWESTERN
 Northwestern Wildcats
 Northwestern (IA) Red Raiders
 Northwestern Connecticut CC Moose
 Northwestern-St. Paul Eagles
 Northwestern Michigan Hawk Owls
 Northwestern Ohio Racers
 Northwestern State Demons and Lady Demons

NORTHWO-NOV
 Northwood Timberwolves
 Norwich Cadets
 Notre Dame Fighting Irish
 Notre Dame College Falcons
 Notre Dame de Namur Argonauts
 Notre Dame Maryland Gators
 Nova Southeastern (or NSU) Sharks

NU-NY
 Nueta Hidatsa Sahnish Storm
 Nunez CC Pelicans
 NYIT Bears
 NYU Violets

O

OA
 Oak Hills Christian Wolfpack
 Oakland Golden Grizzlies
 Oakland CC Raiders
 Oakland City Mighty Oaks
 Oakton CC Raiders
 Oakwood Ambassadors

OB-OG
 Oberlin Yeomen
 Ocean County Vikings
 Occidental Tigers
 Oconee Fall Line Tech Owls
 Odessa Wranglers
 Oglala Lakota Bravehearts
 Oglethorpe Stormy Petrels

OH
 Ohio Bobcats
 Ohio-Zanesville Tracers
 Ohio Christian Trailblazers
 Ohio Dominican Panthers
 Ohio Northern Polar Bears
 Ohio State Buckeyes
 Ohio State-Lima Barons
 Ohio State-Mansfield Mavericks
 Ohio State-Marion Scarlet Wave
 Ohio State-Newark Titans
 Ohio Wesleyan Battlin' Bishops
 Ohlone Renegades

OK
 Oklahoma Sooners
 Oklahoma Baptist Bison
 Oklahoma Christian Eagles and Lady Eagles
 Oklahoma City Stars
 Oklahoma Panhandle Aggies
 Oklahoma Science & Arts Aggies
 Oklahoma State Cowboys and Cowgirls
 Oklahoma Wesleyan Eagles

OL-ON
 Old Dominion Monarchs and Lady Monarchs
 Ole Miss Rebels
 Olin Engineering Phoenix
 Olive-Harvey Panthers
 Olivet Comets
 Olivet Nazarene Tigers
 Olney Central Blue Knights
 Olympic Rangers
 Onondaga CC Lazers

OR
 Oral Roberts Golden Eagles
 Orange Coast Pirates
 Orangeburg-Calhoun Tech Wildcats
 Oregon Ducks
 Oregon Coast CC Sharks
 Oregon State Beavers
 Oregon Tech Hustlin' Owls

OS-OT
 Oswego State Great Lakers
 Otero Rattlers
 Otis Art & Design Owls
 Ottawa Braves
 Ottawa Arizona Spirit
 Otterbein Cardinals

OU-OZ
 Ouachita Baptist Tigers
 Our Lady of the Lake Saints
 Oxford Emory Bald Eagles
 Oxnard Condors
 Owens CC Express
 College of the Ozarks Bobcats
 University of the Ozarks Eagles
 Ozark Christian Ambassadors
 Ozarks Tech CC Eagles

P

PA
 Pace Setters
 Pacific (CA) Tigers
 Pacific (OR) Boxers
 Pacific Lutheran Lutes
 Pacific Union Pioneers
 Paine Lions
 Palm Beach Atlantic Sailfish
 Palm Beach State Panthers
 Palo Alto Palominos
 Palo Verde Pirates
 Palomar Comets
 Panola Ponies
 Paradise Valley CC Pumas
 Paris Junior Dragons
 Park Pirates
 Park Gilbert Buccaneers
 Parkland Cobras
 Pasadena City Lancers
 Pasco-Hernando State Conquistadors
 Passaic County CC Panthers
 Patrick & Henry CC Patriots
 Paul Quinn Tigers
 Paul Smith Bobcats

PE
 Pearl River CC Wildcats
 Pellissippi State CC Panthers
 Pensacola Christian Eagles
 Pensacola State Pirates
 Peninsula Pirates
 Penn Quakers
 Pennsylvania Highlands CC Black Bears
 Penn State Nittany Lions
 Penn State Abington Little Johns
 Pennsylvania Tech Wildcats
 Pepperdine Waves
 Peru State Bobcats

PF-PH
 Pfeiffer Falcons
 Philander Smith Panthers
 Phoenix Bears

PI
 Piedmont Lions
 Piedmont Pacers
 Piedmont Virginia CC Panthers
 Pierce Raiders
 Pierpont CC/Tech Lions
 Pikeville Bears
 Pikes Peak State College Aardvarks
 Pillar Panthers
 Pima CC Aztecs
 Pitt CC Bruisers
 Pittsburg State Gorillas
 Pittsburgh Panthers
 Pittsburgh-Bradford Panthers
 Pittsburgh-Greensburg Bobcats
 Pittsburgh-Johnstown Mountain Cats
 Pittsburgh-Titusville Panthers

PL
 Plymouth State Panthers

PO
 Pomona–Pitzer Sagehens
 Point Skyhawks
 Point Loma Nazarene Sea Lions
 Point Park [Pittsburgh, Pennsylvania] Pioneers
 Polk State Eagles
 Porterville Pirates
 Portland Pilots
 Portland Bible Wildcats
 Portland CC Panthers
 Portland State Vikings
 Post Eagles
 Potomac State Catamounts

PR
 Prairie State Pioneers
 Prairie View A&M Panthers and Lady Panthers
 Pratt CC Beavers
 Presbyterian Blue Hose
 Presentation Saints
 Prince George's CC Owls
 Princeton Tigers
 Principia Panthers
 Providence Friars
 Providence Christian Sea Beggars

PU
 Pueblo CC Panthers
 Puget Sound Loggers
 Purdue Boilermakers
 Purdue Fort Wayne Mastodons
 Purdue Northwest Pride

Q

 Queens Knights
 Queens Charlotte Royals
 Queensborough CC Tigers
 Quincy Hawks
 Quinebaug Valley CC Frogs
 Quinnipiac Bobcats
 Quinsigamond CC Wyverns

R

RA
 Radford Highlanders
 Rainy River CC Voyageurs
 Ramapo Roadrunners
 Randolph WildCats
 Randolph CC Armadillos
 Randolph–Macon Yellow Jackets
 Ranger Rangers
 Rappahannock CC Gulls
 Raritan Valley CC Golden Lions

RE
 Reading Area CC Ravens
 Red Rocks CC Red Foxes
 Redlands Bulldogs
 Redlands CC Cougars
 Redwoods Corsairs
 Reed Griffins
 Reedley Tigers
 Regent Royals
 Regis College Pride
 Regis University Rangers
 Reinhardt Eagles
 Rend Lake Warriors
 Rensselaer Poly Engineers

RH-RI
 Rhode Island Rams
 Rhode Island College Anchormen
 Rhodes Lynx
 Rice Owls
 Richard Bland Eagles
 Richland Thunderducks
 Richmond Spiders
 Richmond CC Panthers
 Rider Broncs
 Ridgewater Warriors
 Rio Grande Red Storm
 Rio Hondo Roadrunners
 Ripon Red Hawks
 RISD Nads
 River Parishes CC Rougarous
 Riverland CC Blue Devils
 Riverside City Tigers
 Rivier Raiders

ROA-ROC
 Roane State CC Raiders
 Roanoke Maroons
 Roanoke-Chowan CC Hawks
 Robert Morris Colonials
 Roberts Wesleyan Red Hawks
 Rochester Yellowjackets
 Rochester (MI) Warriors
 Rochester CC/Tech Yellowjackets
 Rochester Tech Tigers
 Rock Valley Golden Eagles
 Rockford Regents
 Rockhurst Hawks
 Rockingham CC Eagles
 Rockland CC Hawks
 Rocky Mountain Bears

ROG-ROX
 Roger Williams Hawks
 Rogers State Hillcats
 Rogue CC Ospreys
 Rollins Tars
 Roosevelt Lakers
 Rose State Raiders
 Rose-Hulman Tech Fightin' Engineers
 Rosemont Ravens
 Rowan Profs
 Rowan-Cabarrus CC Warriors
 Rowan-South Jersey Roadrunners (Gloucester), Barons (Burlington), and Dukes (Cumberland)
 Roxbury CC Tigers

RU
 Russell Sage Gators
 Rust Bearcats
 Rutgers Scarlet Knights
 Rutgers–Camden Scarlet Raptors
 Rutgers–Newark Scarlet Raiders

S

SAC-SAG
 Sacramento City Panthers
 Sacramento State Hornets
 Sacred Heart Pioneers
 Saddleback Gauchos
 Saginaw Valley State Cardinals

SAINT A-SAINT J
 St. Ambrose Fightin' Bees and Queen Bees
 St. Andrews Knights
 Saint Anselm Hawks
 Saint Augustine's Falcons
 Saint Benedict Bennies
 St. Bonaventure Bonnies
 St. Catherine Wildcats
 St. Charles CC Cougars
 St. Clair County CC Skippers
 St. Cloud State Huskies
 St. Cloud Tech/CC Cyclones
 St. Edward's Hilltoppers
 Saint Elizabeth Eagles
 St. Francis Brooklyn Terriers
 St. Francis (IL) Fighting Saints
 Saint Francis (IN) Cougars
 Saint Francis (PA) Red Flash
 St. John Fisher Cardinals
 Saint John's (MD/NM) Johnnies
 Saint John's (MN) Johnnies
 St. John's (NY) Red Storm
 St. Johns River Vikings
 Saint Joseph Blue Jays
 Saint Joseph's (NY) Bears & Lady Bears (NYC), Golden Eagles & Lady Eagles (Long Island)
 Saint Joseph's Maine Monks
 Saint Joseph's (PA) Hawks

SAINT K-SAINT X
 Saint Katherine Firebirds
 St. Lawrence Saints
 Saint Leo Lions
 Saint Louis Billikens
 St. Louis CC Archers
 College of Saint Mary Flames
 University of Saint Mary Spires
 Saint Mary's (CA) Gaels
 Saint Mary's (IN) Belles
 St. Mary's (MD) Seahawks
 Saint Mary's (MN) Cardinals
 St. Mary's (TX) Rattlers
 Saint Mary-of-the-Woods Pomeroys
 Saint Martin's Saints
 Saint Michael's Purple Knights
 St. Norbert Green Knights
 St. Olaf Oles
 St. Petersburg Titans
 Saint Peter's Peacocks and Peahens
 St. Philip's Tigers
 Saint Rose Golden Knights
 St. Scholastica Saints
 St. Thomas (FL) Bobcats
 St. Thomas (MN) Tommies
 St. Thomas (TX) Celts
 St. Thomas Aquinas Spartans
 Saint Vincent Bearcats
 Saint Xavier Cougars

SAL-SAM
 Salem College Spirits
 Salem CC Oaks
 Salem State Vikings
 Salem University Tigers
 Salisbury Seagulls
 Salt Lake CC Bruins
 Salve Regina Seahawks
 Sam Houston State Bearkats
 Samford Bulldogs
 Sampson CC Vikings

SAN
 San Antonio Armadillos
 San Bernardino Valley Wolverines
 San Diego Toreros
 San Diego Christian Hawks
 San Diego City Knights
 San Diego State Aztecs
 San Francisco Dons
 San Francisco State Gators
 San Joaquin Delta Mustangs
 San Jose City Jaguars
 San Jose State Spartans
 San Mateo Bulldogs
 Sandhills CC Flyers

SANTA
 Santa Ana Dons
 Santa Barbara Vaqueros
 Santa Clara Broncos
 Santa Fe Saints
 Santa Fe CC Saints
 Santa Monica Corsairs
 Santa Rosa Junior Bears
 Santiago Canyon Hawks

SAR-SC
 Sarah Lawrence Gryphons
 Savannah State Tigers and Lady Tigers
 Sauk Valley CC Skyhawks
 SCAD Bees
 Schoolcraft [Livonia/Garden City,  Michigan] Ocelots
 Scott CC Eagles
 Scottsdale CC Artichokes
 Schreiner Mountaineers
 Scranton Royals

SE
 Seattle Redhawks
 Seattle Pacific Falcons
 Seminole State Trojans
 Sequoias Griffins
 Seton Hall Pirates
 Seton Hill Griffins
 Sewanee Tigers
 Seward County CC Saints

SH
 Shasta Knights
 Shaw Bears
 Shawnee State Bears
 Shawnee CC Saints
 Shelton State CC Buccaneers
 Shenandoah Hornets
 Sheridan Generals
 Shepherd Rams
 Shippensburg Raiders
 Shoreline CC Dolphins 
 Shorter College Hawks
 Shorter University Hawks

SI
 Siena Saints
 Siena Heights Saints
 Sierra Wolverines
 Silicon Valley Dragons
 Simmons Kentucky Panthers
 Simmons University Sharks
 Simpson College Storm
 Simpson University Red Hawks
 Sinclair CC Tartan Pride
 Sioux Falls Cougars
 Siskiyous Eagles
 Sisseton Wahpeton Mustangs
 Sitting Bull Suns

SK-SN
 Skagit Valley Cardinals
 Skidmore Thoroughbreds
 Skyline Trojans
 Slippery Rock – The Rock
 Smith  Pioneers
 Snead State CC Parsons
 Snow Badgers

SOL-SON
 Soka Lions
 Solano CC Falcons
 Sonoma State Seawolves

SOUTH
 South Alabama Jaguars
 South Arkansas CC Stars
 South Carolina Gamecocks
 South Carolina-Aiken Pacers
 South Carolina-Beaufort Sand Sharks
 South Carolina-Lancaster Lancers
 South Carolina-Salkehatchie Indians
 South Carolina-Union Bantams
 South Carolina-Upstate Spartans
 South Carolina State Bulldogs
 South Dakota Coyotes
 South Dakota Mines Hardrockers
 South Dakota State Jackrabbits
 South Florida Bulls
 South Florida State Panthers
 South Georgia State Hawks
 South Georgia Tech Jets
 South Mountain CC Cougars
 South Piedmont CC Patriots
 South Plains Texans
 South Puget Sound CC Clippers
 South Suburban Bulldogs

SOUTHEAST-SOUTHEASTERN
 Southeast Arkansas Sharks
 Southeast CC Storm
 Southeast Missouri Redhawks
 Southeastern Fire
 Southeastern Baptist Chargers
 Southeastern CC (IA) Hawks
 Southeastern CC (NC) Rams
 Southeastern Illinois Falcons
 Southeastern Louisiana Lions and Lady Lions
 Southeastern Oklahoma State Savage Storm
 Southeastern Tech Patriots

SOUTHERN
 Southern Jaguars
 Southern-New Orleans Knights
 Southern Arkansas Muleriders and Lady Muleriders
 USC Trojans and Women of Troy
 Southern Connecticut State Owls
 Southern Crescent Tech Tigers
 Southern Idaho Golden Eagles
 Southern Illinois-Carbondale Salukis
 Southern Illinois-Edwardsville Cougars
 Southern Indiana Screaming Eagles
 Southern Maine Huskies
 Southern Maine CC Seawolves
 Southern Maryland Hawks
 Southern Methodist Mustangs
 Southern Miss Golden Eagles
 Southern Nazarene Crimson Storm
 Southern Nevada Coyotes
 Southern New Hampshire Penmen
 Southern Oregon Raiders
 Southern State CC Patriots
 Southern Union State CC Bison
 Southern Utah Thunderbirds
 Southern Virginia Knights
 Southern Wesleyan Warriors

SOUTHWEST
 Southwest Mustangs
 Southwest Baptist Bearcats
 Southwest Minnesota Mustangs
 Southwest Mississippi CC Bears
 Southwest Tennessee CC Saluqis
 Southwest Texas Junior Cowboys

SOUTHWESTERN-SOW
 Southwestern Pirates
 Southwestern Adventist Knights
 Southwestern Assemblies Lions
 Southwestern College (KS) Moundbuilders
 Southwestern College (CA) Bobcats
 Southwestern Christian College Rams
 Southwestern Christian University Eagles
 Southwestern CC Spartans
 Southwestern Illinois Blue Storm
 Southwestern Michigan Roadrunners
 Southwestern Oklahoma State Bulldogs
 Sowela Tech CC Flying Tigers

SP
 Spalding Golden Eagles
 Spartanburg CC Border Collies
 Spartanburg Methodist Pioneers
 Spelman Jaguars
 Spoon River Snappers
 Spring Arbor Cougars
 Spring Hill Badgers
 Springfield Pride
 Springfield Tech CC Rams

STA-STE
 Stanford Cardinal
 Stanly CC Eagles
 Stark State Spartans
 State College of Florida, Manatee–Sarasota Manatees
 State Fair CC Roadrunners
 State Tech Missouri Eagles
 Staten Island Dolphins
 Stephen F. Austin Lumberjacks and Ladyjacks
 Stephens Stars
 Sterling Warriors
 Stetson Hatters
 Stevens Tech Ducks
 Stevenson Mustangs

STI-STR
 Stillman Tigers
 Stockton Ospreys
 Stonehill Skyhawks
 Stony Brook Seawolves
 Stony Brook Southampton Colonials
 Stratford Cardinals

SUF-SUL
 Suffolk Rams
 Suffolk County CC Sharks
 Sul Ross State Lobos

SUNY
 SUNY Adirondack Timberwolves
 SUNY Binghamton Bearcats
 SUNY Buffalo – see Buffalo
 SUNY Brockport Golden Eagles
 SUNY Broome CC Hornets
 SUNY Cobleskill Fighting Tigers
 SUNY Cortland Red Dragons
 SUNY Delhi Broncos
 SUNY Empire Bluebirds
 SUNY-ESF Mighty Oaks
 SUNY Farmingdale Rams
 SUNY Fredonia Blue Devils
 SUNY Geneseo Blue Knights
 SUNY Herkimer Generals
 SUNY Institute of Technology Wildcats
 SUNY Maritime College Privateers
 SUNY Morrisville Mustangs
 SUNY New Paltz Hawks
 SUNY Old Westbury Panthers
 SUNY Oneonta Red Dragons
 SUNY Orange Colts
 SUNY Oswego Great Lakers
 SUNY Plattsburgh Cardinals
 SUNY Poly Wildcats
 SUNY Potsdam Bears
 SUNY Purchase Panthers
 SUNY Schenectady Ducks
 SUNY Stony Brook Seawolves
 SUNY Sullivan Generals
 SUNY Ulster Senators

SUR-SY
 Surry CC Knights
 Sussex County CC Skylanders
 Swarthmore Phoenix
 Sweet Briar Vixens
 Syracuse Orange

T

TA
 Tabor Bluejays
 Tacoma CC Titans
 Taft Cougars
 Talladega Tornadoes
 Tallahassee CC Eagles
 Tampa Spartans
 Tarleton State Texans
 Taylor Trojans

TEC-TER
 Tech Lowcountry Pride
 Temple Owls
 Tennessee Volunteers and Lady Volunteers
 Tennessee-Chattanooga Mocs
 Tennessee-Martin Skyhawks
 Tennessee-Southern FireHawks
 Tennessee State Tigers and Lady Tigers
 Tennessee Tech Golden Eagles
 Tennessee Wesleyan Bulldogs
 Tennessee Temple Crusaders
 Terra State CC Titans

TEX
 Texarkana Bulldogs
 Texas Longhorns
 Texas-Arlington Mavericks
 Texas-Dallas Comets
 Texas-El Paso Miners
 Texas-Permian Basin Falcons
 Texas-Rio Grande Valley Vaqueros
 Texas-San Antonio Roadrunners
 Texas-Tyler Patriots
 Texas A&M Aggies
 Texas A&M–Central Texas Warriors
 Texas A&M–Commerce Lions
 Texas A&M–Corpus Christi Islanders
 Texas A&M–Galveston Sea Aggies
 Texas A&M International Dustdevils
 Texas A&M–Kingsville Javelinas
 Texas A&M–San Antonio Jaguars
 Texas A&M–Texarkana Eagles
 Texas Christian Horned Frogs
 Texas College Steers
 Texas Lutheran Bulldogs
 Texas Southern Tigers
 Texas Southmost Scorpions
 Texas State Bobcats
 Texas Tech Red Raiders and Lady Raiders
 Women's teams in sports that have men's teams, most notably basketball, use "Lady Raiders".
 Texas Wesleyan Rams and Lady Rams
 Texas Woman's Pioneers

TH-TI
 Thaddeus Stevens Tech Bulldogs
 Thiel Tomcats
 Thomas College Terriers
 Thomas University Night Hawks
 Thomas More Saints
 Thomas Nelson CC Gators
 Three Rivers CC Raiders
 Tidewater CC Storm
 Tiffin Dragons

TO
 Toccoa Falls Screaming Eagles
 Tohono O'odham CC Jegos
 Toledo Rockets
 Tompkins Cortland CC Panthers
 Tougaloo Bulldogs
 Touro Bulls
 Towson Tigers

TR
 Transylvania Pioneers
 Treasure Valley CC Chukars
 Trenholm State CC Beavers
 Trevecca Nazarene Trojans
 Tri-County Tech Hawks
 Trine Thunder
 Trinidad State Trojans
 Trinity (CT) Bantams
 Trinity (FL) Tigers
 Trinity (TX) Tigers
 Trinity Baptist Eagles
 Trinity Bible Lions
 Trinity Christian Trolls
 Trinity International Trojans
 Trinity Valley CC Cardinals
 Trinity Washington Tigers
 Triton Trojans
 Trocaire Bruins
 Troy Trojans
 Truckee Meadows CC Lizards
 Truett McConnell Bears
 Truman Falcons
 Truman State Bulldogs

TU-TY
 Tufts Jumbos
 Tulane Green Wave
 Tulsa Golden Hurricane
 Turtle Mountain Mighty Mikinocks
 Tusculum Pioneers
 Tuskegee Golden Tigers and Lady Tigers
 Tyler Junior Apaches

U

UA-UN
 UArts Unicorns
 UHSP Eutectics
 Umpqua CC Riverhawks
 UConn Huskies
 Union College (Kentucky) Bulldogs and Lady Bulldogs
 Union College (Nebraska) Warriors
 Union College (New York) Dutchmen and Dutchwomen
 Union County Owls
 Union Seminary Squirrels
 Union University Bulldogs and Lady Bulldogs
 United States Sports Academy Eagles
 United Tribes Tech Thunderbirds

UP-UV
 Upper Iowa University Peacocks
 Ursinus Bears
 Ursuline Arrows
 Utah Utes, Runnin' Utes (men's basketball), and Red Rocks (women's gymnastics)
 Utah State Aggies
 Utah State-Eastern Golden Eagles
 Utah Tech Trailblazers
 Utah Valley Wolverines
 Utica Pioneers
 UVA Wise Cavaliers

V

VA
 Valdosta State Blazers
 Valencia Matadors
 Valley City State Vikings
 Valley Forge Military Cadets
 Valor Christian Warriors
 Valparaiso Beacons
 Vance-Granville CC Vanguards
 Vanderbilt Commodores
 Vanguard Lions
 Vassar Brewers
 Vaughn Tech Warriors

VE
 Ventura Pirates
 Vermilion CC Ironmen
 Vermont Catamounts
 Vermont Tech Purple Knights

VI
 Victor Valley Rams
 Villa Maria Vikings
 Villanova Wildcats
 Vincennes Trailblazers
 Virginia Cavaliers
 Virginia–Wise – see UVA Wise
 Virginia Commonwealth Rams
 Virginia Highlands CC Wolves
 Virginia Lynchburg Dragons
 Virginia State Trojans
 Virginia Tech Hokies
 Virginia Union Panthers
 Virginia Wesleyan Marlins
 Viterbo V-Hawks
 VMI Keydets

VO
 Volunteer State CC Pioneers
 Voorhees Tigers

W

WAB-WAR
 Wabash Little Giants
 Wabash Valley Warriors
 Wagner Seahawks
 Wake Forest Demon Deacons
 Wake Tech CC Eagles
 Waldorf Warriors
 Walla Walla Wolves
 Walla Walla CC Warriors
 Wallace CC Governors
 Wallace CC Selma Patriots
 Wallace State CC Lions
 Walsh Cavaliers
 Warner Royals
 Warner Pacific Knights
 Warren County CC Golden Eagles
 Warren Wilson Owls
 Wartburg Knights

WAS-WAY
 Washburn Ichabods
 Washington Huskies
 Washington Adventist Shock
 Washington College Shoremen
 Washington County CC Golden Eagles
 Washington and Jefferson Presidents
 Washington and Lee Generals
 Washington State Cougars
 Washington State CC Bucks
 Washington St. Louis Bears
 Washington Tech Red Pandas
 Washtenaw CC Wolves
 Waubonsee CC Chiefs
 Wayland Baptist Pioneers
 Wayne CC Bison
 Wayne County CC Wildcats
 Wayne State College Wildcats
 Wayne State University Warriors
 Waynesburg Yellow Jackets

WEA-WES
 Weatherford Coyotes
 Webber International Warriors
 Weber State Wildcats
 Webster Gorloks
 Welch Flames
 Wellesley Blue
 Wells Express
 Wenatchee Valley Knights
 Wentworth Leopards
 Wesleyan College Wolves
 Wesleyan University Cardinals

WEST-WESTC
 West Alabama Tigers
 West Chester Golden Rams
 West Coast Baptist Eagles
 West Florida Argonauts
 West Georgia Wolves
 West Georgia Tech Golden Knights
 West Hills Coalinga Falcons
 West Hills Lemoore Golden Eagles
 West Liberty Hilltoppers and Lady Toppers
 West Texas A&M Buffaloes
 West Los Angeles Wildcats
 West Shore CC Foxes
 West Valley Vikings
 West Virginia Mountaineers
 West Virginia-Parkersburg Riverhawks
 West Virginia Northern CC Thundering Chickens
 West Virginia State Yellow Jackets
 West Virginia Tech Golden Bears and Lady Golden Bears
 West Virginia Wesleyan Bobcats and Lady Bobcats
 Westchester CC Vikings
 Westcliff Warriors

WESTERN
 Western Carolina Catamounts and Lady Catamounts
 Western Colorado Mountaineers
 Western Connecticut Colonials
 Western Idaho Eagles
 Western Illinois Fighting Leathernecks
 Western Kentucky Hilltoppers and Lady Toppers
 Western Michigan Broncos
 Western Nebraska CC Cougars
 Western New England Golden Bears
 Western New Mexico Mustangs
 Western Nevada Wildcats
 Western Oklahoma State Pioneers
 Western Oregon Wolves
 Western Piedmont CC Pioneers
 Western Tech Cavaliers
 Western Texas Westerners and Lady Westerners
 Western Washington Vikings
 Western Wyoming CC Mustangs

WESTF-WESTM
 Westfield State Owls
 Westminster (MO) Blue Jays
 Westminster (PA) Titans
 Westminster (UT) Griffins
 Westmont Warriors
 Westmoreland County CC Wolfpack

WH
 Wharton County Junior Pioneers
 Whatcom CC Orcas
 Wheaton (IL) Thunder
 Wheaton (MA) Lyons
 Wheeling Cardinals
 White Mountains CC Golden Eagles
 Whitman Blues
 Whittier Poets
 Whitworth Pirates

WIC-WIN
 Wichita State Shockers
 Widener Pride
 Wilberforce Bulldogs
 Wilbur Wright Rams
 Wiley Wildcats
 Wilkes Colonels
 Wilkes CC Cougars
 Willamette Bearcats
 William & Mary Tribe
 William Carey Crusaders
 William Jewell Cardinals
 William Paterson Pioneers
 William Peace Pacers
 William Penn Statesmen and Lady Statesmen
 William Smith Herons
 William Woods Owls
 Williams Ephs
 Williams Baptist Eagles
 Williamson Jaguars
 Williamson Trades Mechanics
 Williamsburg Tech Brewers
 Williston State Tetons
 Wilmington College Fighting Quakers
 Wilmington University Wildcats
 Wilson Phoenix
 Wingate Bulldogs
 Winona State Warriors
 Winston-Salem State Rams and Lady Rams
 Winthrop Eagles

WIS-WIT
 Wisconsin–Eau Claire Blugolds
 Wisconsin–Green Bay Phoenix
 Wisconsin–La Crosse Eagles
 Wisconsin-Madison Badgers
 Wisconsin–Marathon County Huskies
 Wisconsin–Marshfield/Wood County Marauders
 Wisconsin–Milwaukee Panthers
 Wisconsin-Oshkosh Titans
 Wisconsin–Parkside Rangers
 Wisconsin–Platteville Pioneers
 Wisconsin-Richland Roadrunners
 Wisconsin–River Falls Falcons
 Wisconsin-Rock County Rattlesnakes
 Wisconsin-Sheboygan Wombats
 Wisconsin–Stevens Point Pointers
 Wisconsin–Stout Blue Devils
 Wisconsin–Superior Yellowjackets
 Wisconsin–Whitewater Warhawks
 Wisconsin Lutheran Warriors
 Wittenberg Tigers
 Winston-Salem State Rams

WO-WY
 Wofford Terriers
 Woodland CC Eagles
 Wooster Fighting Scots
 Wor-Wic CC Dolphins
 Worcester Poly Engineers
 Worcester State Lancers
 Wright State Raiders
 Wyoming Cowboys and Cowgirls

X-Z

X
 Xavier Musketeers
 Xavier (LA) Gold Rush and Gold Nuggets

Y
 Yale Bulldogs or Elis
 Yavapai Roughriders
 Yeshiva Maccabees and Lady Macs
 York (NE) Panthers
 York PA Spartans
 York County CC Hawks
 Young Harris Mountain Lions
 Youngstown State Penguins
 Yuba 49ers

Z
 Zane State Tigers

See also
List of college sports team nicknames
List of U.S. college mascots
List of college nickname changes in the United States

References

Team Nicknames
Team Nicknames
United S
College Teams